= Swiss Watch Expo =

American retailer of pre-owned luxury watches

Swiss Watch Expo is an American retailer based in Atlanta. Founded in 2009, the company is one of the largest American retailers of pre-owned luxury watches. It stocks close to 40 brands, with Rolex making up about half of its business.

== History ==
Swiss Watch Expo was founded in Atlanta in 2009 by Victoria and Jake Rokhlin, immigrants from Ukraine. Jake Rokhlin, who left Ukraine in 1989, completed Rolex's watchmaker training and worked for an Atlanta jeweler before going into business with his wife. Victoria Rokhlin, a former computer programmer, pushed the business to begin selling online. The company started with 60 watches in stock and held around 3,000 by 2021.

Victoria Rokhlin's son, Eugene Tutunikov, an early investor in the company, joined it in 2016 after ten years trading derivatives in New York and Chicago and became its chief executive. According to the company, sales reached $25 million to $30 million by 2019.

The company sells online and from a showroom in Buckhead. About 90 percent of its business is online, and showroom visits are by appointment. As of 2024, it held about 3,500 watches, with an estimated value of about $35 million. In 2025, the company reported $100 million in sales.
